Brothers is a 2009 American psychological drama war film directed by Jim Sheridan and written by David Benioff. A remake of the 2004 Danish film, it follows Captain Sam Cahill (portrayed by Tobey Maguire), a presumed-dead prisoner of the War in Afghanistan who deals with extreme PTSD while reintegrating into society following his release from captivity. The film also stars Jake Gyllenhaal as Cahill's brother and Natalie Portman as his wife. Both films take inspiration from Homer's epic poem the Odyssey.

The film received a mixed response and grossed $43 million. Maguire, however, received particular praise for his performance, receiving a Golden Globe nomination for Best Actor in a Motion Picture Drama.

Plot
In October 2007, United States Marine Corps captain Sam Cahill is about to embark on his fourth combat deployment to Afghanistan. He is married to his high school sweetheart Grace, and together they raise two young daughters, Isabelle and Maggie. Sam's brother, Tommy, is a convicted felon who is released from prison on parole a few days before Sam;s deployment. At a family dinner with Tommy and Sam's parents, Hank and Elsie, Maggie reveals to Tommy that Grace dislikes him, and Hank insults Tommy for his lack of success compared to Sam.

During Sam's tour, his Blackhawk helicopter is shot down in Helmand Province. Sam and private Joe Willis are the sole survivors and are taken prisoner by Taliban fighters. Sam and Joe are declared killed in action by the U.S. government. At Sam's funeral, Hank attempts to drive Elsie and the girls home while drunk, but Tommy stops him. Hank again berates Tommy; and Tommy blames Hank for influencing Sam to join the Marines because of his own Vietnam War service.

Tommy attempts to redeem himself and completes a kitchen remodel for Grace. Hank and Tommy also mend their relationship, and Grace bonds with Tommy, aided by his growing paternal connection with Isabelle and Maggie. Grace and Tommy share a fireside kiss, but do not take their attraction any further. However, Tommy continues to remain close with the family and his nieces grow attached to him. Meanwhile, Sam and Joe are tortured by their captors and Sam is eventually forced to beat Joe to death.

Sometime later, Sam is rescued by American forces and returns home, where he struggles to readjust, showing signs of severe post-traumatic stress disorder; his daughters grow fearful and resentful toward him. Sam also lies to Joe's widow about her husband's death. His paranoia also causes him to believe Grace and Tommy fell in love while he was gone, causing him to remain aloof. During Maggie's birthday, Isabelle is rude to her sister and jealously complains that Maggie got what she wanted for her birthday, while Isabelle did not. Isabelle scolds Sam for being in Afghanistan during her birthday, but being able to attend Maggie’s. Isabelle then begins to play with a balloon loudly, despite objections from Sam and Grace, until Sam snaps and pops the balloon out of fury.  Already scared and resentful of Sam's erratic behavior and violent mood swings, an angry and hurt Isabelle falsely claims that Tommy and Grace are having an affair and tells Sam that she wishes he had actually died. Returning home, believing his daughter’s story, Sam becomes enraged, and proceeds to destroy the kitchen with a crowbar while screaming at Grace. When Tommy attempts to bring Sam into an embrace, trying to calm his brother's violent breakdown, Sam realizes that Tommy has called the police and aims his pistol at him.

The police arrive and enter a standoff with Sam, who fires the gun into the air before holding it to his own head, contemplating suicide. He reluctantly surrenders after several pleas from Tommy and Grace. He is arrested and admitted to a Department of Veterans' Affairs mental hospital. Grace visits, giving him an ultimatum that if he does not tell her what happened, he will lose her forever. Sam finally confides in her that he killed Joe and they embrace. In narration, he wonders if he will ever live a normal life.

Cast
 Tobey Maguire as Capt. Sam Cahill
 Jake Gyllenhaal as Tommy Cahill
 Natalie Portman as Grace Cahill
 Sam Shepard as Hank Cahill
 Mare Winningham as Elsie Cahill
 Bailee Madison as Isabelle Cahill
 Taylor Geare as Maggie Cahill
 Patrick Flueger as Pvt. Joe Willis
 Carey Mulligan as Cassie Willis
 Clifton Collins Jr. as Maj. Cavazos
 Jenny Wade as Tina
 Omid Abtahi as Yusuf
 Navid Negahban as Murad
 Enayat Delawary as Ahmed
 Ethan Suplee as Sweeney
 Arron Shiver as A. J.
 Ray Prewitt as Owen

Reception

Box office
On its opening weekend, the film opened #3 with $9,527,848 behind New Moon and The Blind Side. Since its box office debut the film has grossed $43,318,349 worldwide.

Critical response
Brothers received mixed reviews from film critics. On the review aggregator Rotten Tomatoes, the film has an approval rating of 64% based on 159 reviews, with an average score of 6.2/10. The website's critical consensus reads, "It plays more like a traditional melodrama than the Susanne Bier film that inspired it, but Jim Sheridan's Brothers benefits from rock-solid performances by its three leads." On Metacritic, the film has a weighted average score of 58 out of 100, based on 31 reviews, indicating "mixed or average reviews".

Tobey Maguire received critical acclaim for his dramatic performance; Roger Ebert gave the film three and a half stars and wrote that Brothers is "Tobey Maguire's film to dominate, and I've never seen these dark depths in him before." Claudia Puig of USA Today observed the resemblance between Maguire and Gyllenhaal, and praised their onscreen chemistry. Regarding Portman's performance, Puig opined that it was "subdued and reactive". Writing for New York magazine, David Edelstein praised the three main actors: "Sheridan's actors work with their intellects fully engaged—and they engage us on levels we barely knew we had." He also complimented the cinematography and Sheridan's ability to pull the reader into the plot. Entertainment Weekly's Owen Gleiberman gave the film a rating of C+, writing, "Brothers isn't badly acted, but as directed by the increasingly impersonal Jim Sheridan, it’s lumbering and heavy-handed, a film that piles on overwrought dramatic twists until it begins to creak under the weight of its presumed significance."

Accolades
Of his Golden Globe Award nomination, Tobey Maguire said "I had no expectation about getting a nomination, but I was watching nonetheless. My wife and my son got really excited. I was sort of surprised — I was like, 'Oh, wow.' And I couldn't hear the latter part of my name." The Edge of U2 described how the band planned to celebrate their nomination. "I think we might have a pint of Guinness and eat a potato in honor of (director) Jim (Sheridan) and his great piece of work."

Home media
Brothers was released on DVD and Blu-ray on March 23, 2010.

Opera adaptation 
Brothers – The Opera is an opera based on the original 2004 Danish version of the film by Icelandic composer Daníel Bjarnason; it was premiered at the Musikhuset Aarhus on 16 August 2017. It was commissioned by Den Jyske Opera. Kerstin Perski wrote the libretto and the director was Kasper Holten. To celebrate Aarhus as the European Capital of Culture 2017, three stage works – a musical, dance, and an opera all based on films by Susanne Bier – were commissioned and performed in Musikhuset.

References

External links
 
 
 
 
 

2009 films
2009 psychological thriller films
American remakes of Danish films
Films directed by Jim Sheridan
Films produced by Michael De Luca
Films shot in New Mexico
American psychological thriller films
Adultery in films
Pashto-language films
Films about families
Films about brothers
Lionsgate films
Relativity Media films
Films about the United States Marine Corps
Films set in Afghanistan
War in Afghanistan (2001–2021) films
Films scored by Thomas Newman
Films about bank robbery
Films about post-traumatic stress disorder
Films with screenplays by David Benioff
Films about veterans
2000s English-language films
2000s American films